Lance Timothy Mason (born August 26, 1967) is a convicted murderer, former politician, government official, and judge, who served in various offices in and representing Cleveland, Ohio.

As a judge, he served on the Cuyahoga County Court of Common Pleas. He was a member of the Ohio Senate, representing the 25th District from 2007 to 2008. From 2002 to 2006, he was a member of the Ohio House of Representatives, where he served as Assistant Minority Whip during his final year. He was also an assistant prosecuting attorney for the county and was an aide to U.S. Representative Stephanie Tubbs Jones. In 2017, he worked as an official for the city of Cleveland under mayor Frank G. Jackson.

Early life
Mason was born on August 26, 1967 and graduated from Shaker Heights High School. He received a Bachelor of Arts from the College of Wooster and Juris Doctor from the University of Michigan Law School in 1992.

Political career
From 2002 to 2008, Mason was a member of the Ohio General Assembly, first as a state representative, and then state senator.  In August 2008, Ohio governor Ted Strickland announced that he appointed Mason to fill a vacancy on the Cuyahoga County Court of Common Pleas.  In 2017, Mason was hired by the City of Cleveland as an official in the Frank Jackson administration, with the title of Minority Business Development Administrator.

Murder and Legal issues
On August 2, 2014, Mason was arrested and charged for beating his wife while he was driving and their children were in the backseat. Later that day, police seized ammunition and weapons from Mason's home, including shotguns, semiautomatic rifles, handguns, smoke grenades, a bulletproof vest, a sword, and over 2,500 rounds of ammunition. The couple, who were married in 2005, had separated the previous March. Their divorce was finalized on November 12, 2015. Mason pleaded guilty on August 13, 2015, to attempted felonious assault and domestic violence, and agreed to serve time in prison. On September 3, the Ohio Supreme Court suspended Mason from practicing law for being a convicted felon. Mason submitted his resignation as judge on September 15. The next day, he was sentenced to two years in prison; he was released after 9 months. During sentencing, the judge read from a police report which detailed how Mason punched his wife 20 times with his fist, smashed her head against the car's center console five times, and continued to beat her, bite her, and threaten her after she exited the car.  As a convicted felon, Mason will never be allowed to serve as a judge in the future, but could practice law depending on the outcome of disciplinary action by the state Supreme Court.

Murder charge
On November 17, 2018, Mason stabbed his ex-wife to death at a house owned by his sister, in front of their two children. Mason took his ex-wife's SUV and fled the scene, striking a police cruiser and injuring the police officer inside before he was arrested. On August 20, 2019, he pleaded guilty and on September 12, 2019 he was sentenced to life in prison with the possibility of parole after 35 years.

References

External links

Project Vote Smart - Senator Lance T. Mason (OH) profile
Follow the Money - Lance T. Mason
2006 2004 2002 campaign contributions

African-American judges
African-American state legislators in Ohio
College of Wooster alumni
1967 births
Living people
Democratic Party members of the Ohio House of Representatives
Ohio lawyers
Democratic Party Ohio state senators
Ohio state court judges
Politicians from Shaker Heights, Ohio
University of Michigan Law School alumni
21st-century American politicians
Ohio politicians convicted of crimes
20th-century American lawyers
Judges convicted of crimes
Politicians convicted of murder
Violence against women in the United States
American people convicted of murder
21st-century American judges
20th-century African-American people
21st-century African-American politicians